Addyme inductalis is a species of snout moth in the genus Addyme. It was described by Francis Walker in 1863. It is found in Taiwan, Japan, India, Sri Lanka, Borneo, Sumatra, Sulawesi and Australia.

References

Moths described in 1863
Phycitini
Moths of Australia
Moths of Asia